Gogglebox is a British reality television series created by Stephen Lambert, Tania Alexander and Tim Harcourt, and broadcast on Channel 4. The series documents families and groups of friends around the United Kingdom who are filmed for their observations and reactions to the previous week's television from their own homes. The first series launched on 7 March 2013, and the show is currently airing its twenty-first series as of 24 February 2023. The show was narrated by Caroline Aherne from its launch until her death in July 2016, after which Craig Cash took over.

The show has won numerous awards. In 2014 and 2022, it won a BAFTA in the Reality & Constructed Factual category. From 2015 to 2018, in 2021 and in 2022, it won a National Television Award. The success of Gogglebox spawned three spin-off series, including a version featuring children (Gogglesprogs), a version featuring 16 to 24-year-olds as they watch online content (Vlogglebox) and a version featuring celebrities (Celebrity Gogglebox).

History
The show was created by Stephen Lambert, Tania Alexander, and Tim Harcourt. Lambert is a media executive who is also responsible for the Channel 4 television shows Wife Swap, Faking It, Undercover Boss, and The Secret Millionaire. Alexander was Director of Factual Entertainment at Lambert's independent production company Studio Lambert, who said the idea was for Gogglebox to be a mix of the ITV comedy show Harry Hill's TV Burp, which looked back at the previous week's television, and the BBC sitcom The Royle Family, which centres around a television-fixated family, but with real, ordinary people. Harcourt, a Creative Director for Studio Lambert, had the original idea for Gogglebox while watching the 2011 London riots, and along with Alexander, devised the format for the show. They wondered what people talked about while watching the news, and came up with the idea of cutting between people watching the same TV shows. Farah Golant, the boss of All3Media, said: "But the show isn't really about TV. The show is about people's lives, their relationships, their living rooms and the way children and parents talk about TV [...] That's quite priceless. It captures a cultural response to something that's happening in the world.

The concept of Gogglebox was criticised before the show aired; Alexander recalled people thinking Channel 4 had run out of ideas, but credited the network's head of factual David Glover as the one who recognised the show's potential and subsequently ordered Alexander to produce a proof of concept tape. The show's team set about casting, and it was during this period they signed on Leon and June Bernicoff. Alexander described the original reel as "a little rough around the edges, gosh it was actually really rough", and thought the script was "God awful" which was read by a narrator whose tone of voice was incompatible. Despite this, Glover felt strongly towards the concept and gave the green-light for a mini-series. The first series consisted of four episodes, the first of which aired on 7 March 2013. The show was a success, and a second series of 13 episodes began in September 2013.

In November 2020, Alexander left Gogglebox after seven years to pursue a fresh challenge. She was replaced by Studio Lambert's deputy creative director, Mike Cotton, alongside Gogglebox executive producer Leon Campbell.

Production
The people cast on Gogglebox were found by the show, and the producers do not advertise for participants. Lambert said this approach is key to the show's success as it results in more likeable people and the audience can get to know the cast over time. From the beginning, Alexander did not want to feature people who wanted to be on television, and sought individuals "that had the ability to make us laugh very naturally and that's quite hard." One of the methods used to find participants is termed "street casting", whereby the show's team looked in everyday public places; Leon and June were found in a bridge club, and Stephen and Chris were found in a hair salon. In later series, members of the show's production team visited random houses and held up a card that contained something, such as a picture of the British Prime Minister or a Daily Mail headline, and noted how quick the person responded and any funny, interesting, or insightful comments they had. The show has also found participants through recommendations, which was how the Siddiqui family and couple Giles and Mary were found.

The programme is filmed in the viewers' homes using two small remotely controlled cameras, known as "hot heads", operated by a small team elsewhere in the home that set up a temporary production control room. This team consists of a producer/director, gallery operator, assistant, audio engineer, researcher for live logging, and a runner. Each episode of Gogglebox is made in two days, and Alexander said that people who assumed the show is cheap or easy to make makes her "blood boil". Filming starts on Friday and continues through the week, but most of the first four days are spent assessing the filmed material. Four-person crews circulate between the households two or three evenings each week, and the cast watch the same programs as each other, which can amount to as much as six hours of television. Alexander said that the biggest problem encountered during the filming stage is the cast forgetting that they are meant to be commenting and have to be given "gentle prompts". She added that "the craft happens over the last couple of days before it goes out on the Friday", which usually begins on a Tuesday afternoon or the Wednesday, with the production team working through the night to produce an initial cut. Lambert said the skill involved is "throwing away 99.9% of what people say". The team reviews the first edit on a Thursday afternoon, after which further cuts or tweaks are made before the narration is recorded and the episode is delivered for broadcast.

Cast

This is a list of cast members currently appearing in the programme.

Episodes

Awards and nominations

Spin-off series
A version of the show featuring children, titled Gogglesprogs, launched as a Christmas special on Christmas Day 2015, and was followed by a full-length series which began airing on 17 June 2016. In 2017, a spin-off show titled Vlogglebox aired on E4, which featured reactions from 16 to 24-year-olds as they watch online content on their smartphones, laptops or tablets. In 2019, it was announced that a celebrity version had been ordered; Celebrity Gogglebox began airing in 2019. It was later renewed for a second series, which aired in 2020, a third series which aired in 2021, and a fourth series in 2022. 

In August 2022, it was announced that a Welsh-language version of Gogglebox, Gogglebocs Cymru, would be produced for S4C, after Channel 4 had agreed to release exclusivity of its rights to the show in the UK. S4C issued a competitive tender for the production rights on the same day, with the show scheduled to debut in autumn 2022 as part of the channel’s 40th anniversary.

International versions

Australian version

An Australian edition of the programme debuted on 11 February 2015. It is a co-production between pay TV provider Foxtel and commercial Network Ten. It airs on Foxtel's Lifestyle Channel first and is repeated 24 hours later on Ten. The programme started its second season on 30 September 2015, and its third season in 2016. It is currently in its 17th season as of March 2023.

American and Canadian versions

Canadian (Bell Media), and American broadcasters. The American and Canadian versions, both called The People's Couch, premiered on Bravo on March 10, 2014 (although a three-episode pilot run was aired in October 2013) and Bravo (Canada) in July 2014.

A celebrity version, called Celebrity Watch Party, premiered on Fox on May 7, 2020.

Irish version

An Irish edition of the programme debuted on 22 September 2016, a co-production between Kite Entertainment (Dublin) and Studio Lambert (London). By 2021, seven series had been broadcast.

Polish version
Polish version called Gogglebox. Przed telewizorem premiered on TTV on September 6, 2014. It is currently in its 17th season as of September 2022.

Russian version
Russian version called Диван (translated as "The Couch") premiered on STS on March 30, 2017. Only one season aired, consisting of 8 episodes.

Finnish version
The Finnish version called Sohvaperunat (translated as "Couch potatoes") premiered in February 2015. The show started its 12th season in September 2021.

Welsh version
S4C and Studio Lambert aired Gogglebocs Cymru on November 2nd as part of the channel's 40th anniversary celebrations. The show is narrated by Welsh comedian Tudur Owen.

References

External links
 
 
 

2013 British television series debuts
2010s British reality television series
2020s British reality television series
Channel 4 reality television shows
English-language television shows
Television series about television
Television series by All3Media